Bonnemain is a commune in the Ille-et-Vilaine department of the region in Brittany in northwestern France.

Population

Inhabitants of Bonnemain are called Bonnemainésiens in French.

See also
Communes of the Ille-et-Vilaine department

References

External links

  Cultural Heritage
Official site
Mayors of Ille-et-Vilaine Association 

Communes of Ille-et-Vilaine